Jorge Gerdau Johannpeter (born December 8, 1936) is a Brazilian businessman of German descent, great-grandson of Johann Heinrich Kaspar Gerdau, Gerdau Group's founder. He held various positions within the Gerdau Group, and was its CEO from 1983 to 2006. He was chairman until 2015. Since 2011, he has been president of the Chamber of Management Policies, Performance and Competitiveness (CGDC), an organization linked to the Presidency of Brazil.

As a member of the Dilma Rousseff government, he has advocated the reduction in the number of ministries, which he considered to be excessive.

Sports 
Jorge Gerdau was a horse rider until 2009, being the owner of the Haras Joter, which in 1996 placed three animals of his creation in the Atlanta Olympic Games. His son André Bier Gerdau Johannpeter (current CEO of Gerdau Group) won a bronze medal in the competition of show jumping (team).

Gerdau is also an aficionado of surfing, a sport he practiced in Rio Grande do Sul from the early 1960s.

Awards 
 Great Cross (National Order of Scientific Merit), 2002
 Juran Medal (American Society for Quality), 2010
 Gold Medal (Americas Society), 2012

Controversies 
In October 2002 it was announced that the Haras Joter Ltda. (controlled by Jorge Gerdau) had been benefited from a loan of R$ 45.3 million (about US$ 15.1 million) granted by the Gerdau Group. The move caused controversy in the financial market, because it would not have been previously approved by the shareholders. In its defense, the Group reported that the loan was granted at market rates and repaid in full in August of the same year.

See also
 List of Brazilians by net worth

References

External links 
 Jorge Gerdau Johannpeter at the David Rockefeller Center for Latin American Studies

1936 births
Brazilian people of German descent
Living people
People from Rio de Janeiro (city)
Recipients of the Great Cross of the National Order of Scientific Merit (Brazil)
Federal University of Rio Grande do Sul alumni
Gerdau family